The Investigative Committee of the Russian Federation has since January 2011 been the main federal investigating authority in Russia. Its name (Sledstvennyi komitet) is usually abbreviated to SKR. The agency replaced the Russian prosecutor general's Investigative Committee and operates as Russia's anti-corruption agency. It is answerable to the president of Russia and has statutory responsibility for inspecting the police forces, combating police corruption and police misconduct and is responsible for conducting investigations into local authorities and federal governmental bodies.

On January 21, 2011, President Dmitry Medvedev signed a decree appointing Alexander Bastrykin, then the acting chair of the prosecutor general's Investigative Committee, as Sledkom's chairperson.

In 2012 President Medvedev began to discuss the possibility of creating a Federal Anti-Corruption Bureau under Sledkom, as part of the campaign against corruption and to combat corruption in the Russian police.

Number of employees
The number of agents in the Investigative Committee (except the military investigative agents) is 19,156 employees, and from January 1, 2012, need to be 21,156 employees. The number of the Military Investigators is now 2,034 employees.

According to the 2012 Law on Amendments to some Legislative Acts of the Russian Federation in connection with improving the structure of Preliminary Investigation, it will expand to 60,000 staff, largely by taking over most of the investigators of the Ministry of Internal Affairs and the Federal Drug Control Service.

Management

Chairman of the Investigative Committee

On January 21, 2011, President Dmitry Medvedev signed a decree appointing Alexander Bastrykin, then the acting chair of the prosecutor general's Investigative Committee, as chairperson of the federal investigation agency.

Vice-Chairmen
 Sorochkin Alexander, Vice-Chairman of the Investigative Committee of the Russian Federation – Head of the Main Military Investigation Department (since January 15, 2011; by Presidential decree No. 372)
 Nyrkov Yuri Mikhailovich (since January 15, 2011; by Presidential decree No. 422)
 Piskarev Vasily (since January 15, 2011; by Presidential decree No. 422)
 Leonenko Yelena (since January 15, 2011; by Presidential decree No. 422)
 Karnaukhov Boris (since January 15, 2011; by Presidential decree No. 422)

Structure
The structure of the Central Administration of the Investigative Committee of the Russian Federation includes:
Central Investigation Department
Office for the investigation of particularly important cases involving crimes against persons and public safety
Office for the investigation of particularly important cases involving crimes against the state and the economy
Office of methodological and analytical support
Department of Information Technology and Document Support
Main Military Investigation Department
General Directorate of procedural controls
Directorate of procedural control of the investigating authorities
Directorate of procedural control in the sphere of combating corruption
Directorate of procedural control over the investigation of particularly important cases
Organizational and Analytical Department
Division Document Processing
The main organizational and Inspections Department
Organizational Accountability Office
Information and methodological Directorate
Directorate for Internal Security
Operational services Directorate
Document Processing Division and proofreading
General Directorate of Forensic
Methodical and forensic Directorate
Technical and forensic Directorate
Organization of forensic
Division Document Processing
The main software control of the Investigative Committee of the Russian Federation
Economic and Financial Division
Logistics
Administration
Audit Bureau
Department management activities for the North Caucasus and Southern Federal Districts
Department of organizational and documentation support
Central Investigation Department of the North Caucasus Federal District
Office for the investigation of particularly important cases
Control and management of forensic
Department of interagency cooperation, and physical protection
Organizational and Analytical Department
Division Document Processing
Investigation Department of the Central Federal District
Investigation Department of the North-West Federal District
Investigation Department of the Volga Federal District
Investigation Department of the Ural Federal District
Investigation Departmentof the Siberian Federal District
Investigation Department of the Far East Federal District
Investigation Department of the Southern Federal District
Personnel department
The Legal Department
Directorate for the interaction with the media
Office of International Legal Cooperation
The Office for consideration of applications of citizens and Documentation Assistant
Office for the Protection of State Secrets
Office of Physical Protection
Department of procedural control over the investigation of particularly important cases in the federal districts

The investigative departments of subjects of Russian Federation are subordinated to the Investigative Committee, and the investigative divisions of cities and raions are subordinated to the investigative departments of subjects of Russian Federation. There are specialized investigative departments (investigative departments on transport, investigative department of Baikonur Cosmodrome) which are subordinated to the Investigative Committee and have own subordinated investigative divisions. Finally, there is the Chief Military Investigative Department which is subordinated to the Investigative Committee and have own subordinated military investigative departments (military investigative department of Western Military District, military investigative department of Eastern Military District, military investigative department of Southern Military District, military investigative department of Central Military District, military investigative department of Northern Fleet, military investigative department of Baltic Fleet, military investigative department of Black Sea Fleet, military investigative department of Pacific Fleet, military investigative department of Strategic Missile Forces and Moscow city military investigative department) which in turn have own subordinated military investigative divisions (garrison military investigative divisions).

Officers
Investigators of the Investigative Committee in a broad sense are directly investigators, senior investigators, heads of investigative divisions and their deputies, heads of investigative departments and their deputies, chairman and vice-chairmen of the Investigative Committee. All of them are federal government officials, have special ranks and wear special uniform with shoulder marks. Military investigators (in a broad sense) are military personnel, have military ranks of commissioned officers and wear military uniform with shoulder marks but they are not subordinated to any military authority (excepting higher military investigator).

See also

References

External links

 

Federal law enforcement agencies of Russia